On 29 January 2023, children from the villages of Mir Bashkhel and Sulaiman Talab had gone on a picnic to Tanda Dam in Kohat District, Khyber Pakhtunkhwa, Pakistan, but drowned after their boat capsized. Fifty one children and two adults drowned; five people were rescued – four students and a teacher.

References

2023 disasters in Pakistan
2023 in Khyber Pakhtunkhwa
Boating accident deaths
Deaths by drowning
January 2023 events in Pakistan
Kohat District